This is a list of Alaska suffragists, suffrage groups and others associated with the cause of women's suffrage in Alaska.

Groups 

 Alaska Native Brotherhood, formed in 1912.
 Alaska Native Sisterhood, formed in 1915.
National American Woman Suffrage Association (NAWSA).
Women's Christian Temperance Union (WCTU).

Suffragists and other voting rights advocates 

 Ada Brownell (Seward).
Ida E. Green (Seward).
Margaret Keenan Harrais (Skagway).
Cornelia Templeton Hatcher (Knik).
Milo Kelly (Knik).
Emma Lefevre (Skagway).
 Lena Morrow Lewis (Fairbanks).
Clara Michener (Ketchikan).
Francis Turner Pedersen (Seward).
Harriet Pullen (Skagway).
Lucy Record Spaeth (Ketchikan).
Arthur G. Stroup (Sitka).
Lulu Thompson (Juneau).

Indigenous voting rights activists 

 Tillie Paul (Tlingit).
 William Paul (Tlingit).

See also 

 Timeline of women's suffrage in Alaska
 Women's suffrage in Alaska
Native Americans and women's suffrage in the United States
 Women's suffrage in states of the United States
 Women's suffrage in the United States

References

Sources 

 

Alaska suffrage

Alaska suffragists
Activists from Alaska
History of Alaska
suffragists